Zydeco Scream is a steel roller coaster located at abandoned Six Flags New Orleans in New Orleans, Louisiana. Manufactured by Vekoma, the Boomerang coaster model opened to the public on June 10, 2000. It closed following the permanent closure of the park in the aftermath of Hurricane Katrina in 2005. Remnants of the ride remain standing in disrepair at the defunct park. Prior to Six Flags New Orleans, the ride operated at Parc de Montjuic in Barcelona, Spain from 1990 to 1998.

History
Zydeco Scream first started at the former Parc de Montjuic in Barcelona, Spain as Boomerang from 1990 to 1998, with white tracks and green supports. The roller coaster was relocated to Jazzland as Zydeco Scream in 2000 (Jazzland also opened that same year). A couple years after Six Flags took over the park, Hurricane Katrina hit the park on August 29, 2005, and the park was severely flooded from the Hurricane.

In 2007, Six Flags began to remove rides out of the park. Batman: The Ride was removed in 2007 and taken to Six Flags Fiesta Texas where it was refurbished and reopened as Goliath in 2008. Bayou Blaster and Sonic Slam were removed in 2008 and relocated to Great Escape in Queensbury, New York, where it was refurbished and reopened as Sasquatch in 2009. The Road Runner Express was removed in 2009 and relocated to Six Flags Magic Mountain in Valencia, California, where it was refurbished and reopened in 2011 under the same name. However, Zydeco Scream remains inactive at the park along with other roller coasters and attractions. The park is still closed since 2005 and it is no longer a Six Flags park, it is now owned by the city of New Orleans. As of  November, 2022
, the coaster remains standing but not operating (SBNO).

Ride experience

When the coaster started, the train was pulled backwards up the lift hill, then dropped through the loading gate through a cobra roll and then one loop. At the end of this cycle the train was pulled up the lift hill at the end of the track, then dropped once again allowing the train to go back through the loops backwards. This was the standard Vekoma Boomerang roller coaster design found at forty-three different amusement parks worldwide.

References

Roller coasters in Louisiana
Amusement rides that closed in 1998
Roller coasters operated by Six Flags
Six Flags New Orleans